Forever Free is a sculpture by the American artist Edmonia Lewis. Created in 1867, it commemorates the abolition of slavery in the United States two years earlier. The work differs from many other depictions of abolition from the period by showing the Black man standing and unschackled rather than bound or kneeling. Scholars have frequently puzzled over Lewis's decision to Europeanize the features of the female figure. At least one scholar has suggested that the choice may have been an acknowledgment of the varied appearance and heritage of African Americans such as Lewis herself, who was of both African and Native American descent.

References 

Slavery in art
Marble sculptures
1867 sculptures